Lazaretto Cairn Lighthouse guides vessels westward on their approach to Kingston Harbour. It appears to be a historic daybeacon converted to a lighted aid. It is located on a bluff on the west side of the harbour entrance, opposite Port Royal. It provides the rear light of the Rackhams Cay Range.
Its ground is maintained by the Port Authority of Jamaica, an agency of the Ministry of Transport and Works.

See also

 List of lighthouses in Jamaica

References

External links
Aerial view.

Lighthouses in Jamaica
Buildings and structures in Saint Catherine Parish